Prins Eugens Waldemarsudde (Swedish for Cape Waldemar), is a museum located on Djurgården in central Stockholm.  The name is composed of Waldemar, an Old German noble male name, and udde, meaning cape. It is derived from a historical name of the island Djurgården, Valmundsö (see History of Djurgården.)

History
It was the former home of the Swedish Prince Eugen, who discovered the place in 1892, when he rented a house there for a few days. Seven years later he bought the premises and had a new house designed by the architect Ferdinand Boberg, who also designed Rosenbad (the Prime Minister's Office and the Government Chancellery), and erected 1903–1904.

Prince Eugen had been educated as a painter in Paris and after his death the house was converted to a museum of his own and others paintings. The prince died in 1947 and is buried by the beach close to the house.

Museum
The complex consists of a castle-like main building—the Mansion—completed in 1905, and the Gallery Building, added in 1913. The estate also includes the original manor-house building, known as the Old House and an old linseed mill, both dating back to the 1780s. The estate is set in parkland which features centuries-old oak trees and reflects the prince's interest for gardening and flower arrangement. The Art Nouveau interior, including the cocklestoves, by Boberg are designed in a Gustavian style and makes good use of both the panoramic view of the inlet to Stockholm and the light resulting from the elevated location of the building.

Gallery

See also 
 List of museums in Stockholm
 Culture in Stockholm

References

External links

 Prince Eugen's Waldemarsudde (official website)
 Prins Eugens Waldemarsudde, swedishgardens.se

Art museums and galleries in Stockholm
Djurgården
Buildings and structures in Stockholm
Historic house museums in Sweden
Art Nouveau architecture in Stockholm
Art Nouveau houses
Houses completed in 1904
Royal residences in Sweden